Karl Proisl (9 July 1911 – 2 December 1949) was an Austrian sprint canoeist who competed in the 1930s.

At the 1936 Summer Olympics in Berlin, he won two medals with his partner Rupert Weinstabl: a silver in the C-2 1000 m event and a bronze in the C-2 10000 m event.

Proisl also won two medals at the 1938 ICF Canoe Sprint World Championships in Vaxholm: a gold in the C-2 1000 m event and silver in the C-2 10000 m event. He competed for Germany because it had annexed Austria at the time of the championships.

References

1911 births
1949 deaths
Austrian male canoeists
Canoeists at the 1936 Summer Olympics
Olympic canoeists of Austria
Olympic bronze medalists for Austria
Olympic medalists in canoeing
ICF Canoe Sprint World Championships medalists in Canadian
Medalists at the 1936 Summer Olympics
Olympic silver medalists for Austria